Will  [wil] or Wil is a given name, often a short form (hypocorism) of William, Wilfred, Wilbur, Wilhelmina, Wilma, Willard or Willeke. 

It may refer to:

Men
Will Alsop (1947–2018), British architect 
Will Anderson (disambiguation), multiple people
Will Arnett (born 1970), Canadian-American actor, voice actor and comedian
Will Bagley (1950-2021), American historian
Will Barclay (born 1969), American politician
Will Barnet (1911–2012), American artist
Wil Boessen (born 1964), Dutch football manager and former player
Will Brownsberger (born 1957), American politician
Will Bynum (born 1983), American basketball player
Wil Calhoun, American television producer and writer
Will Chase (born 1970), American actor and singer
Will Clapp (born 1995), American football player
Will Clark (born 1964), American baseball player
Will Clyburn (born 1990), American professional basketball player
Wil Cordero (born 1971), Puerto Rican baseball player
Will Craig (born 1994), American baseball player
Will Dissly (born 1996), American football player
Will Durant (1885–1981), American writer and historian
Will Durst (born 1952), American humorist
Will Eisner (1917–2005), American cartoonist
Will Eno (born 1965), American playwright
Will Estes (born 1978), American actor
Will Ferrell (born 1967), American actor
Will Finn (born 1958), American animator
Will Flemming (born 1979), American sportscaster
Will Fries (born 1998), American football player
Will Forte (born 1979), American actor, comedian, screenwriter, and producer
Will Fuller (born 1994), American football player
Will Geer (1902–1978), American actor and social activist
Will Graham (evangelist) (born 1975), American evangelist
Will Grier (born 1995), American football player
Will Grigg (born 1991), English footballer
Will Gold (born 1996), English Internet personality and musician
Will Harris (American football) (born 1997), American football player
Will Hastings (born 1996), American football player
Will Hay (1888–1949), English comedian
Will H. Hays (1879–1954), American politician
Will Heard (born 1991), English singer-songwriter
Will Hernandez (born 1995), American football player
Will Hill (born 1990), American football player
Will Holden (American football) (born 1993), American football player
Will Hutchins (born 1930), American actor
Wil S. Hylton, American journalist
Will Inman (poet) (1923–2009), American poet
Will Johnson (disambiguation), multiple people
Wil Jones (basketball) (born 1947), American basketball player
Will Keith Kellogg (1860–1951), founder of the Kellogg food company
Will Kemp (actor, born 1977), English actor and dancer
Will Lee (1908–1982), American actor
Wil London (born 1997), American sprinter
Wil Lutz (born 1994), American football player
Will Lyman (born 1948), American voice actor
Will Mallory (born 1999), American football player
Will Mastin (1878–1975), American entertainer
Wil McCarthy (born 1966), American science fiction novelist
Will McClay (born 1966), American football player and coach
Will McDonald IV (born 1999), American football player
Will Muschamp (born 1971), American football head coach
Wil Myers (born 1990), American baseball player
Wil Nieves (born 1977), Puerto Rican baseball player
Will Nightingale (born 1995), English footballer
Will Overstreet (born 1979), American football player
Will Patton (born 1954), American actor
Will Poulter (born 1993), English actor
Will Rayman (born 1997) American-Israeli basketball player for Hapoel Haifa in the Israeli Basketball Premier League
Will Reichard (born 2001), American football player
Wil Robinson (born 1949), American basketball player
Will Rogers (1879–1935), American humorist
Will Rogers (American football) (born 2001), American football player
Will Ryan (1949-2021), American voice actor
Will Sampson (1933-1987), American actor and painter
Will Sasso (born 1975), Canadian actor
Will Shipley (born 2002), American football player
Will Shortz (born 1952), American puzzle creator
Wil Shriner (born 1953), American actor
Will Smith (born 1968), American actor and rapper
Will Solomon (born 1978), American basketball player
Will Sommers (died 1560), the best-known court jester of King Henry VIII
Will Streets (1886–1916), English soldier and poet of the First World War
Will Sutton (born 1991), American football player
Wil Trapp (born 1993), American soccer player
Wil Traval (born 1980), Australian actor
Wil van der Aalst (born 1966), Dutch computer scientist, and professor 
Will Vinton (1947-2018), American filmmaker
Wil Waluchow, Canadian philosopher
Will Weaver (basketball), American basketball coach
Wil Wheaton (born 1972), American actor
Will Whitehorn (born 1960), British business executive
Will Wright (actor) (1894–1962), American actor
Will Wright (born 1960), American video game designer
Will Wynn (born 1961), former mayor of Austin, Texas
Will Yun Lee (born 1971), American actor

Women
 Wil Burgmeijer (born 1947), Dutch retired speed skater
 Wil van Gogh (1862–1941), Dutch nurse and feminist, youngest sister of Vincent van Gogh

Fictional characters
 Wil, the main character of the Welsh-language TV series Wil Cwac Cwac
 Will, in the video game Advance Wars: Days of Ruin
 Will (Pokémon), in the Pokémon universe
 Will Blake, in the Goosebumps series
 Will Byers, one of the main characters of Stranger Things
Will Cloud, one of the main characters in the film, Cloud 9
 Will Gardner, on the American TV series The Good Wife
 Will Griggs, on the Australian soap opera Neighbours
 Will Herondale from Cassandra Clare's The Infernal Devices
 Will Horton, on the American soap opera Days of Our Lives
 Will Hunting, protagonist of the 1997 film Good Will Hunting
 Wil Ohmsford, in the fantasy novel The Elfstones of Shannara and the TV series The Shannara Chronicles
 Will Robinson, one of the main characters in the TV series Lost in Space
 Will Sawyer, the protagonist in Skyscraper (2018 film)
 Will Scarlet, one of Robin Hood's Merry Men
 Will Solace from Rick Riordan's Trials of Apollo
 Will Truman, one of the title characters of the TV sitcom Will & Grace
 Will Turner, in the Pirates of the Caribbean film series
 Wilhelmina "Will" Vandom, one of the five main titular characters in the 2017 republished comic book series of W.I.T.C.H. Her full name changed to Wilma in TV series adaptation. 

Hypocorisms
English masculine given names